Inseminoid (titled Horror Planet in the United States) is a 1981 British science fiction horror film directed by Norman J. Warren. It stars Judy Geeson, Robin Clarke and Stephanie Beacham, along with Victoria Tennant in one of her early film roles. The plot concerns a team of archaeologists and scientists who are excavating the ruins of an ancient civilisation on a distant planet. One of the women in the team (Geeson) is impregnated by an alien creature and taken over by a mysterious intelligence, driving her to murder her colleagues one by one and feed on them.

Inseminoid was written by Nick and Gloria Maley, a married couple who had been part of the special effects team on Warren's earlier film Satan's Slave. Filmed between May and June 1980 on a budget of £1 million, half of which was supplied by the Shaw Brothers, it was shot mostly on location at Chislehurst Caves in Kent as well as on the island of Gozo in Malta, combined with a week's filming at Lee International Studios in London. Composer John Scott completed the film's electronic musical score over recording sessions that lasted many hours.

Despite a good box office response in the UK and abroad, Inseminoid failed to impress most commentators, who criticised the effects and production design. The overall quality of the acting was also poorly received, although Geeson's performance was praised. Criticism was also directed at the premise involving an alien insemination, which some commentators viewed as a weak imitation of Alien (1979). Both Warren and 20th Century Fox, distributor of Alien, rejected claims that Inseminoid was influenced by this film.

Academic criticism of Inseminoid has concentrated on the film's depiction of the female sex, and female sexualities, in the context of corruption by an alien source. Commentators have noted that as well as portraying Sandy as an abject Other, the film presents a battle of the sexes as Sandy kills her former friends. The film was novelised by Larry Miller and released on VHS to strong sales.

Plot
On a freezing planet, a team of 12 Xeno Project archaeologists and scientists are excavating the ruins of an ancient civilisation. They discover a cave system containing wall markings and crystals of unknown origin. During a survey, a mysterious explosion cripples photographer Dean White and injures Ricky Williams. Deciphering the wall markings, exolinguist Mitch theorises that the civilisation was built on a concept of dualism: the planet orbits a binary star and seems to have been ruled by twins. Medical assistant Sharon discovers that the crystals are surrounded by an energy field and suggests that the civilisation was controlled by a form of chemical intelligence.

A crystal sample begins to pulsate, causing the intelligence to take control of Ricky through a wound on his arm. In his delusional state, he is compelled to leave the team's base and go back into the caves. He throws Gail into a pile of twisted metal, damaging her environmental suit and trapping her foot. Desperate to free herself, Gail removes her helmet and tries to amputate her foot with a chainsaw, but instead freezes to death in the planet's toxic atmosphere. Documentation officer Kate Carson shoots Ricky with a harpoon gun before he opens the airlock and evacuates all of the base's air.

Ricky and Gail are buried outside the base. Later, Mitch and Sandy return to the caves to collect more crystals. A monstrous alien creature appears and dismembers Mitch, then rapes Sandy with a transparent tubular phallus pumping green liquid. Sandy is taken back to base and treated by the team's doctor, Karl, who discovers that the attack has triggered an accelerated pregnancy. When further underground explosions block off the caves, the survivors are left with nothing to do but wait for Xeno to pick them up.

The intelligence takes over Sandy, giving her superhuman strength. She stabs Barbra to death with a pair of scissors and mutilates Dean and the remains of Mitch, drinking their blood. The rest of the team take refuge in the control room as Sandy uses explosives to blow up the base transmitter. After Sandy appears to return to her normal self, Karl, Sharon and Commander Holly McKay try to sedate her. However, Sandy reverts to her violent state, killing Karl and Holly and disembowelling their corpses.

Mark radios Sandy from the control room to distract her while Kate and Gary arm themselves with chainsaws from a storage room. Sandy uncovers the ruse and harpoons Gary outside the airlock, breathing the atmosphere to no ill effect as she feeds on his flesh. She then re-enters the base and gives birth to hybrid twins. Mark stumbles across the newborns and leaves them with Sharon as Sandy blows up the door to the control room and smashes the equipment inside. Sandy uses another explosive charge to wound Kate, then kills her. Finally, Mark overpowers Sandy and strangles her to death with a length of cable. He returns to Sharon to find one of the twins drinking from her torn-out throat, then comes face to face with its sibling.

Twenty-eight days later, a Xeno shuttle lands on the planet to investigate the loss of contact with the team. With the base in ruins and its occupants either dead or missing, commandos Corin and Roy abandon the search for survivors and shuttle pilot Jeff radios Xeno for clearance to return. The final shots reveal that the twins have stowed away inside a storage compartment on board the shuttle.

Cast

 Judy Geeson as Sandy
 Robin Clarke as Mark
 Jennifer Ashley as Holly McKay
 Stephanie Beacham as Kate Carson
 Steven Grives as Gary
 Barrie Houghton as Karl
 Rosalind Lloyd as Gail
 Victoria Tennant as Barbra
 Trevor Thomas as Mitch
 Heather Wright as Sharon
 David Baxt as Ricky Williams
 Dominic Jephcott as Dean White
 John Segal as Jeff
 Kevin O'Shea as Corin
 Robert Pugh as Roy

Production

Development
After making Satan's Slave (1976), Prey (1977) and Terror (1978), Norman J. Warren was to have directed a film called Gargoyles. After this production collapsed without a finished script, Warren and producer Richard Gordon accepted a story idea from the husband-and-wife duo of Nick and Gloria Maley, who had been members of the special effects unit on Satan's Slave. The Maleys wrote the film both as an amalgam of their favourite science-fiction ideas and to showcase their effects work. Their script, which indicated that the film is set two decades in the future in a militaristic universe, was provisionally titled Doomseeds; this was changed to Inseminoid to avoid confusion with the 1977 film Demon Seed.

Casting
Gordon cast American actors Robin Clarke and Jennifer Ashley as Mark and Holly while on business in Hollywood. Clarke had recently played a supporting role in The Formula; Ashley had appeared in a number of independent films. Beacham, who had two young children at the time, accepted the role of Kate Carson to support her family, recalling in a 2003 interview: "I had to choose between a play that I really, really wanted to do, which would have paid me £65 a week, and this script for a film called Inseminoid. Hey! No choice. Two pink babies asleep upstairs! No choice!"

Filming

The Shaw Brothers agreed to supply half of the proposed £1 million budget and became partners in the production, with elder brother Run Run Shaw credited as presenter in the opening titles. Nick Maley reprised his effects role to build the puppets of the alien twins. Principal photography began on 12 May 1980 with a crew of 75. The production spent three weeks filming in Chislehurst Caves in Kent, which served as the tunnels of the underground complex. This was followed by one week's studio filming at Lee International Studios in Wembley Park, London. A fifth week was devoted to effects and linking shots, completed by the second unit at Film House on London's Wardour Street. The crew then travelled to the island of Gozo in Malta for a supplemental location shoot lasting two days, during which they filmed the long shots set on the planet's surface. The strong Mediterranean sun ensured good lighting.

Warren said that given Inseminoids low budget, filming the underground scenes in actual caves produced a more realistic result than any potential studio option. However, the cold, damp and airless conditions inside the caves, compounded by the uneven terrain, caused numerous minor injuries among the cast and crew as well as damage to filming equipment. Shooting often ran for 12 hours at a time and some of those present developed intense feelings of claustrophobia in the confined space. Gordon felt that these uncomfortable working conditions made the actors' performances more credible: "I think all this paid off in terms of what we got on the screen for the budget, but the circumstances were very difficult." Due to the lack of space, the crew were forced to set up their production office, as well as the dressing and make-up rooms, in a car park some distance from the caves. As filming started to fall behind schedule, Warren was forced to cut some of the scenes of Ricky's rampage inside the caves: "Three pages of script, which I had to condense into one shot. Having to make such an enormous compromise was not a happy choice for me, but it was the only way of getting us back on schedule." The shoot ultimately overran by two days.

As filming progressed, the working relationship between Warren and Clarke broke down. According to Warren, Clarke often refused to follow instructions, opting instead to give his own interpretation of the script to a point where every scene featuring him became "an uphill struggle" to film. Warren remembered that during preparations for a fight scene, he lost his temper with Clarke: "Robin kept on ranting and raving about his ideas to the point where I couldn't take it any more. So I screamed at him to shut up and keep quiet. I told him I was the director and we would do the scene the way I said. He was shocked, he just stopped dead, and from that point on he hardly said a word." Warren's rapports with the rest of the cast were positive. He described Geeson as "an absolute dream to work with" and praised her performance, arguing that it avoided being unintentionally comic. Gordon was similarly impressed, saying that Geeson fully embraced the role of Sandy and did not complain that it demeaned her as an actress. Warren also had memories of Beacham's "very professional" performance, recalling that "with tongue firmly in cheek, she would often wind me up by asking what her motivation was for a particular action, just as I about to call 'Action!', knowing full well that my answer would be, 'Because it's in the script'."

Post-production
Inseminoid was shot on 35 mm Eastman Kodak film with anamorphic lenses. Warren remembered that this format produced an "incredibly sharp image and what I would term as the 'American' look." The film was brightened during post-production following concerns that it would be harder to sell to television broadcasters if it appeared too dimly lit. Cuts were made to some of the more graphic shots of Sandy giving birth to ensure that the film would not be rejected by the British Board of Film Censors (BBFC). According to Warren, editor Peter Boyle "had a natural feel for the material and managed to create just the right pace and rhythm throughout the film." The title sequence was produced by Oxford Scientific Films.

Music
As Inseminoids low budget precluded hiring an orchestra, Warren and composer John Scott agreed that the film should have an electronic score. The recording involved many hours of multi-tracking and overdubbing. Warren described the completed soundtrack as an "amazing achievement", noting that electronic scores were still "quite experimental" at the time. The soundtrack was released as an LP record in 1982.

Release

Distribution
In Germany, cinemas began showing the film in January 1981 under the title Samen des Bösen (English: Seeds of Evil). In the UK, the film premiered on 22 March in the Midlands, subsequently opening at 65 cinemas in the region. It reached London in October. The film was commercially successful, reaching number five at the UK box office and number seven in France. Inseminoid was also one of the first films to have a VHS release not long after its initial cinema run, and in November 1981 peaked at number seven in the UK video charts. It was re-released on VHS in 1992 and 1998.

In the UK, the film's promotion included a regional mailshot consisting of a circular that showed a screaming Geeson in character as Sandy with the tagline "Warning! An Horrific Alien Birth! A Violent Nightmare in Blood! Inseminoid at a Cinema Near You Soon!" Warren regretted this move, commenting: "The problem with mail drops is that you have no way of knowing who lives in the house, or who will see it first. It could be a pregnant woman, and old lady, or even worse, a young child. So it was not such a good idea."

To Warren's displeasure, foreign distributor Almi renamed the film Horror Planet for its North American release. This was later changed back to Inseminoid.

Certification
The BBFC originally certified the film X, and later 18; in 2005, it reduced the rating to 15.

The Motion Picture Association of America gave the film an R rating for "profanity, nudity, violence, rape and gore".

Critical response

Inseminoid was nominated for the Fantasporto award for best film and won the Fantafestival award for best special effects. Roger Corman congratulated Warren on the film and considered hiring him as a director. However, Inseminoid failed to impress members of the British Academy of Film and Television Arts, who according to Warren, dismissed it as "'commercial rubbish! ... Not the sort of thing the Academy should be showing ... And certainly not the kind of film the British film industry should be making.'" He also remembered that it was not well liked by female audiences: "It seems it is quite common for pregnant women to have nightmares about giving birth to some kind of monster. Of course, all their complaints and their letters which were printed in the local papers only helped to increase the queue at the box office."

Alan Jones of Starburst magazine expressed a preference for the British members of the cast, calling Geeson "absolutely first-rate" but criticising the "weak performances from the token Americans", Robin Clarke and Jennifer Ashley. Praising the film's cost-effective production values, he stated that its depictions of violence carried Warren's "particular trademark". He added that Inseminoid is "not faultless by any means", citing a predictable and often "ridiculous" plot as one of the film's failings. However, he concluded that it met audience expectations for a science fiction B movie, describing it as "far less routine and far more enjoyable than I had expected."

In the US, Inseminoid made the Los Angeles Times top ten list. Reviews elsewhere were more negative. Edward Jones of Virginia's The Free Lance–Star praised the "novel touch" of casting an expectant mother as the villain but added that "in what has to be a new low, even for extraterrestrial-horror films, all the men end up punching this pregnant woman in the stomach." He summed up the film as "no more than a mix of everything-you've-ever-seen-in-a-horror-movie-and-didn't-particularly-want-to-see-again." In a review for the Boca Raton News, Skip Sheffield branded the film "horrible" and "cheapo", advising readers to "imagine Alien without the fantastic sets, convincing special effects and literate dialogue, and you have a picture of Horror Planet." He also argued that the graphic violence is not suspenseful, punning on the name Run Run Shaw in his conclusion that "Horror Planet is a film to run, run away from – fast."

AllMovie rates the film one star out of five. Reviewer Cavett Binion calls Geeson's performance "more than a bit uncomfortable to watch", describes the rape scene as "surreal and truly disgusting" and considers the choice of title "sleazy". Douglas Pratt writes that the film features poor acting and production design with "some gooey gore shots but few other thrills". He concedes that the film "goes through the motions properly, however, so fans will probably find it worth passing the time."

Warren rejected the notion that Inseminoid is comparable to a "video nasty". On the film's supposed cult status, he said: "If Inseminoid has become some form of cult movie, then I am very pleased and, indeed, very flattered." He added that if he were to re-make the film, he would demand a longer shooting schedule and reduce the lighting to heighten the suspense.

Interpretation

Inseminoid has been criticised as a perceived imitation, "knock-off" or "rip-off" of the 1979 science-fiction horror film Alien. Peter Wright, a film historian and lecturer at the University of Liverpool, believes that the "atmospheric" cave sequences and the mess hall scene preceding Ricky's madness may have been inspired by Ridley Scott's film, comparing the former to the sequences set on the desolate planetoid and the latter to the violent reveal of the alien "chestburster". Wright considers the Alien connection potentially "exploitative"; to Barry Langford of the University of London, it underlines UK cinema's dependence on its US counterpart. Alan Jones argues that "any similarity between Inseminoid and Alien is totally intentional. Except here is the basic idea contained in Alien taken to its sleaziest extreme." He finds one such parallel in the character of Kate (Stephanie Beacham), whom he likens to Ellen Ripley (Sigourney Weaver). However, he also regards Contamination (1980) and Scared to Death (1981) as less effective imitations of Scott. Edward Jones argues that the plot of Inseminoid also borrows from the novel Dracula (1897), the TV series The Bionic Woman (1976–78) and the films The Thing from Another World (1951) and Night of the Living Dead (1968).

Though he acknowledged its similarities to Alien, Warren denied claims that Inseminoid was made as an imitation, pointing out that the script for his film was completed months before Alien was released in the UK. He also said that representatives of 20th Century Fox, which distributed Alien, were shown the completed Inseminoid and that even they discounted the possibility: "... in fact, the head of Fox sent us a very nice letter saying how much he enjoyed the film and wished us luck with the release ... I find it flattering that anyone can compare Alien, which cost in the region of $30 million, with Inseminoid, which cost less than £1 million. We must have done something right."

Various commentators have discussed Inseminoids depiction of sexual reproduction, female sexuality, conflict between male and female gender roles, pregnancy, new motherhood and Otherness. Wright interprets Sandy's transformation as a "direct manifestation of masculine anxiety regarding female reproductive capacity". He argues that the film's horror is internalised within the seed of the alien being, which renders Sandy "woman-as-other" or "abject "Other". This is in contrast with Alien, which revolves around the transfer of "fear of woman" to "alien other". Wright argues that Inseminoid is reminiscent of Demon Seed (1977), in which a woman is raped and impregnated by an artificially-intelligent computer: "in both films, women are framed as 'Other' by their sexual congress with more conventional iconic others: the machine and the alien." In all of these films, pregnancy is depicted as a source of horror; in Inseminoid specifically, this is conveyed by the "uterine and cervical" title sequence, which to Wright suggests "entering the realm of the monstrous womb ... the titling reveals a microscopic insect resident in the body of a larger organism."

Wright argues that the distorted representation of the womb reveals similarities to David Cronenberg's The Brood (1979), in which a woman gives birth to deformed offspring through parthenogenesis. Analysing the rape sequence itself, in which Karl uses a syringe to inject Sandy with an unknown substance, Wright makes a connection to dialogue in other scenes implying that the women on the archaeological team are regularly given contraceptive injections. Sandy's impregnation, conflicting with the suppression of fertilisation represented by Karl's hypodermic (and phallic) needle, reveals "coherent sexism": it "attacks the very notion of female sexual freedom, while suggesting, paradoxically, that contraception is the responsibility of women." Sandy's accelerated pregnancy and regression to the level of a savage add to her depiction as an abject Other or object of "male paranoia".

During the fight between Sandy and Gary, Sandy waits until Gary has half-suffocated before killing him. Wright suggests that this sequence is reassuring from a male perspective as it suggests that no woman – not even one with unnatural strength – is strong enough to kill a man in cold blood. That Sandy is ultimately killed by a man (Mark) makes her an aid in the re-empowerment of the male sex, although her offspring are quick to avenge their mother. Comparing the plot of Inseminoid to religious scripture, Christopher Partridge of Lancaster University refers to the twins as "essentially space Nephilim, technological demons with appetites and habits reminiscent of the mythic forebears."

The film's sexual references continue into the epilogue, which shows the arrival of rescuers Jeff, Corin and Roy. In an allusion to the menstrual cycle, the characters state that 28 days have passed since Xeno lost contact with the team. The deaths of the archaeologists are attributed to an "internal disturbance of some kind", which Wright describes as "an ironic phrase which encapsulates the film's vision of pregnancy as an irruption of Otherness from within."

On the subject of Larry Miller's novelisation, which he calls "imaginative and misogynistic", Wright notes a number of scenes that are absent from the film and distort the female form, causing revulsion in the reader. Miller has Sandy grow sores ooze pus from her nipples, which Wright likens to a new mother producing colostrum. Sandy accepts these unnatural changes with fascination.

See also

 List of British films of 1981
 List of horror films of 1981
 List of films featuring extraterrestrials
 List of films set in the future
 List of monster movies
 Reproduction and pregnancy in speculative fiction

References

External links
 
 
 
 

1980s English-language films
1980s monster movies
1980s pregnancy films
1980s science fiction adventure films
1981 films
1981 horror films
1981 independent films
British body horror films
British independent films
British monster movies
British pregnancy films
British science fiction horror films
British space adventure films
Films about cannibalism
Films about extraterrestrial life
Films about rape
Films directed by Norman J. Warren
Films scored by John Scott (composer)
Films set in the future
Films set on fictional planets
Films shot in Kent
Films shot in London
Films shot in Malta
Shaw Brothers Studio films
1980s British films